This is a list of all captains of Fenerbahçe, including honours.

Captains

References

Notes

Captains
Fenerbahçe
Captains